The 2014–15 Florida State Seminoles women's basketball team, variously Florida State or FSU, represented Florida State University during the 2014–15 NCAA Division I women's basketball season. Florida State competed in Division I of the National Collegiate Athletic Association (NCAA). The Seminoles were led by eighteenth year head coach Sue Semrau and played their home games at the Donald L. Tucker Center on the university's Tallahassee, Florida campus. They were members of the Atlantic Coast Conference.

Florida State finished the regular season with a record of 27–3 (14–2 in ACC play), finishing in second place, both school records. They appeared in the finals of the ACC Tournament for the first time, losing to Notre Dame in the championship game and finishing as conference runner-up. The Seminoles were selected to play in the NCAA tournament and received the highest seed in school history. They ended the season in the semifinals after compiling a 32–5 record, setting the school record for most wins in a season and matching their furthest run in the tournament.

Previous season
The Seminoles finished the 2013–14 season 21–12, 7–9 in ACC play to finish in ninth place. They lost in the quarterfinals of the ACC tournament to Notre Dame. They were invited to the NCAA tournament where they lost in the second round to Stanford.

Roster

Depth chart

Honors
 Naismith Trophy Watchlist
Adut Bulgak
 Naismith Coach of the Year Semifinalist
Sue Semrau
 Naismith Coach of the Year Finalist
Sue Semrau
 Pat Summitt Trophy Finalist
Sue Semrau

All-ACC 
Three players were chosen as all-conference selections:
First Team
Adut Bulgak
Second Team
Leticia Romero
Freshman Team
Shakayla Thomas
Shakayla Thomas and Leticia Romero were named to the All-ACC Tournament team. Adut Bulgak and Leticia Romero were named to the Greensboro Regional All-Tournament team.

All-Americans
Honorable Mention
Adut Bulgak
Leticia Romero

Rankings

Schedule
In the ACC Media Poll, Florida State was picked to finish fifth in the conference.

|-
!colspan=12 style="background:#; color:white;"| Exhibition

|-
!colspan=12 style="background:#; color:white;"| Regular season

|-
!colspan=12 style="background:#; color:white;"| ACC Women's Tournament

|-
!colspan=12 style="background:#; color:white;"| NCAA Women's Tournament

Awards
ESPNW National Player of the Week
Adut Bulgak
ESPNW Coach of the Year
Sue Semrau
Associated Press National Coach of the Year
Sue Semrau
WBCA Coach of the Year
Sue Semrau

Conference
ACC Player of the Week
Adut Bulgak
ACC Sixth Player of the Year
Shakayla Thomas
ACC Coach of the Year
Sue Semrau

Media
All Seminoles games will air on the Seminole IMG Sports Network. WQTL will be the new home of Seminoles women's basketball thanks to a new contract with Red Hills Broadcasting.

References

External links
 Official Team Website
 Media Almanac

Florida State
Florida State Seminoles women's basketball
Florida State
Florida State Seminoles women's basketball seasons